Thymus caespititius is dwarf, aromatic mat-forming groundcover shrub. It is native to oceanic areas in the Iberian Peninsula (northwest Portugal and northwest Spain) and the Atlantic archipelagos of the Azores and Madeira.

The rose, lilac or white flowers are borne in small, flattened mat-hugging heads from late spring to summer.

Cultivation
Thymus caespititius, grown as an ornamental plant, and is hardy down to USDA Zone 7.  The cultivar Thymus caespititius 'Aureus' has narrow, light gold leaves.

Gallery

References

caespititius
Flora of Portugal
Flora of Spain
Flora of the Azores
Herbs
Garden plants of Europe
Groundcovers